Kasnäs is a village in the municipality of Kimitoön, Finland. It belongs to the archipelago of Hitis. Blåmusslan, one of the two information centers of the Archipelago National Park is situated here. The ferries to the archipelago of Hitis, including Vänö and Tunnhamn, leave from here. There is also a guest harbour and a spa hotel in Kasnäs.

External links
The Visitor Centre Blåmusslan
Kasnäs Archipelago Spa

Villages in Finland
Kimitoön